Martin Psohlavec (born 12 February 1981) is a Czech footballer (forward) playing currently for FK Ostrov.

Psohlavec previously played for FC Viktoria Plzeň in the Czech Gambrinus liga.

References

External links

Martin Psohlavec at Sport.de

1981 births
Living people
Czech footballers
Czech First League players
FC Viktoria Plzeň players
1. FC Slovácko players
Association football forwards